Events from the year 1696 in England.

Incumbents
 Monarch – William III
 Parliament – 3rd of King William III

Events
 January
 Great Recoinage of 1696: The Parliament of England passes the Recoinage Act.
 Colley Cibber's play Love's Last Shift is first performed at the Theatre Royal, Drury Lane in London.
 27 January – the ship HMS Royal Sovereign (formerly HMS Sovereign of the Seas, 1638) catches fire and burns at Chatham, after 57 years of service.
 15 February – a Jacobite assassination attempt against King William III is foiled.
 March – Habeas Corpus suspended during a Jacobite invasion scare.
 April – window tax introduced.
 May – Great Recoinage of 1696: Shortage of silver coinage results in the guinea being officially revalued at 21 shillings, instead of 30.
 21 November – John Vanbrugh's play The Relapse, or Virtue in Danger first performed at the Theatre Royal, Drury Lane.

Undated
 Board of Trade and Plantations established.
 Main façades of Chatsworth House in Derbyshire completed in a pioneering English Baroque style.

Publications
 Edward Lloyd (coffeehouse owner) probably begins publication of Lloyd's News, a predecessor of Lloyd's List, in London.
 Poets Nahum Tate and Nicholas Brady publish New Version of the Psalms of David ("Tate and Brady"), a metrical psalter.

Births
 27 June – William Pepperrell, colonial soldier (died 1759)
 14 July – William Oldys, antiquarian and bibliographer (died 1761)
 12 August – Maurice Greene, composer (died 1755)
 13 October – John Hervey, 2nd Baron Hervey, statesman and writer (died 1743)
 22 December – James Oglethorpe, general and founder of the state of Georgia as a colony (died 1785)

Deaths
 18 March – Robert Charnock, conspirator (born c. 1663)
 30 April – Robert Plot, naturalist (born 1640)
 28 May – William Gregory, politician and judge (born 1625)
 30 May – Henry Capell, 1st Baron Capell, First Lord of the Admiralty (born 1638)
 24 June – Philip Henry, minister (born 1631)
 11 July – William Godolphin, politician (born 1635)
 13 September – Caleb Banks, politician (born 1659)
 8 December – Charles Porter, English-born judge (born 1631)
 12 December – John Hampden (1653–1696), politician (born 1653)

References

 
Years of the 17th century in England